The Banks of the Bièvre near Bicêtre is an early 20th century painting by French artist Henri Rousseau. Done in oil on canvas, the work depicts the working class community of Bicêtre on the outskirts of southern Paris. The painting is in the collection of the Metropolitan Museum of Art.

References

1909 paintings
Paintings by Henri Rousseau
Paintings in the collection of the Metropolitan Museum of Art